The Cadillac Escalade is a full-size luxury SUV engineered and manufactured by General Motors. It was Cadillac's first major entry into the SUV market. The Escalade was introduced for the 1999 model year in response to competition from the Mercedes-Benz M-Class, Range Rover and Lexus LX as well as Ford's 1998 release of the Lincoln Navigator. The Escalade project went into production only ten months after it was approved. The Escalade is built in Arlington, Texas. The word "escalade" refers to a siege warfare tactic of scaling defensive walls or ramparts with the aid of ladders or siege towers. More generally, it is a French word which is the noun-equivalent form of the French verb escalader, which means "to climb or scale".

The Escalade is currently sold in North America and select international markets (Europe and Asia) where Cadillac has official sales channels. The Escalade ESV (Escalade Stretch Vehicle) is sold in North America, Russia, and Middle East but is available by special order only in some international markets. The right-hand-drive Escalade and Escalade ESV are available through the third-party conversion specialists without official agreement with Cadillac in Australian, Oceanic, and Japanese markets.

First generation (1999)

The introduction of the Lincoln Navigator in the 1998 model year necessitated that General Motors be able to compete in the burgeoning American market for full-size luxury-type trucks. This generation was only a five-seat SUV. Fearing the growing hegemony of the Lincoln Navigator, the Escalade was rushed through the design process to reach dealers quickly. Essentially little more than a badge-engineered GMC Yukon Denali, the SUV's aesthetics were similar to the Denali and the final vehicle was smaller than the Navigator. The Escalade's underpinnings were borrowed from the Yukon Denali line, with the GMC logos on the center caps replaced with Cadillac's crest. All first-generation Escalades featured Auto-Trac selectable 4x4. The 1999-2000 Escalade achieves  city and  highway based on U.S. EPA test protocols.

The first-generation Escalade (as well as its mechanically identical twin, the GMC Yukon Denali), was available in a single configuration (one "base" trim level with one four-wheel-drive (4X4) drive train option), and included a generous amount of standard equipment, with few options available. Standard equipment included sixteen-inch chrome-clad aluminum-alloy wheels, color-keyed front and rear bumpers and side cladding panels, an OnStar in-vehicle telematics and communications system, a top-of-the-line premium GM-Delco A/M-F/M cassette stereo with remote-mounted CD changer, automatic tone control (ATC), clock, and six-speaker Bose premium amplified audio system, luxury leather-trimmed seating surfaces with embossed logos in both front bucket seats, power-adjustable front bucket seats with driver's memory system, heated front and rear seating surfaces, full power equipment (windows, door locks, and heated side mirrors), a security alarm, keyless entry, full instrumentation, tri-zone climate controls for the front and rear seats, rear climate control vents, rear audio system and climate controls, a full overhead console with storage, an auto-dimming rearview mirror with compass and temperature gauge, wood interior trim, a leather-and-wood-wrapped steering wheel with cruise controls and embossed logo, automatic front head and fog lamps, roof rails with preparation for an optional roof rack, among other standard equipment.

While base MSRP of the 2000 GMC Yukon Denali increased to $43,535 (up $460 from $43,075 in 1999), the Cadillac Escalade retained a base MSRP of $46,225 in both 1999 and 2000. The GMC Yukon Denali included a unique front fascia and front and rear bumpers to differentiate it from its non-luxury cousin, the GMC Suburban. The only other physical differences between the first-generation Cadillac Escalade and GMC Yukon Denali were the emblems on the front grilles, front doors, rear tailgates, steering wheels, and front-seat embroidery.

General Motors retains the first Cadillac Escalade produced at Arlington Assembly in 1998, a 1999 Aspen White model, in its Heritage Collection, VIN # 400001. The only standard colors available were Silver Sand, Sable Black, Aspen White and Bordeaux Red Pearl. Yukon Denali standard colors included Silvermist Metallic, Spruce Green (1999), Emerald Green Metallic (2000), Black Onyx, and Dark Toreador Red Metallic.

Second generation (2002)

Unlike its Chevrolet and GMC siblings, which launched for the 2000 model year, Cadillac delayed the Escalade's switch to the GMT820 chassis until February 2001 as a 2002 model, the last of the three General Motors full-size truck and SUV brands to switch to the new chassis; Cadillac unveiled the 2002 model year Escalade in August 2000 at Pebble Beach, while continuing to sell the 2000 model year trucks. Rear-wheel drive was standard, as was a 5.3 L V8. All-wheel drive was standard on the ESV and EXT and was optional on the short wheelbase Escalade. The special high-output Vortec 6.0 L V8 engine was the sole engine choice on all-wheel drive models whether it was the short wheelbase, ESV, or EXT until mid-year 2005 when the 5.3L was dropped altogether. Mid-year 2005, all rear-wheel drive and all-wheel drive Escalades came with the high output 6.0L Vortec V8. All models (except for the EXT) offered seating up to eight people.

The "StabiliTrak" electronic stability control system was upgraded to a four-wheel version, High Intensity Discharge (HID) low beam headlights, power-adjustable pedals and signal outside mirrors were added as a standard feature in 2003, along with a Bulgari-branded clock. For 2004, XM Satellite Radio, second-row bucket seats, and a tire pressure monitoring system were made standard on all Escalades except the EXT. Also in 2004, the Platinum edition Escalade ESV was introduced at a base price of $71,025; it featured the luxury utility segment's first factory-installed 20-inch chrome wheels, a slightly lowered suspension, heated and cooled seats (front and back), heated and cooled cup holders, moon roof, second and third row monitors, an interior that included an ebony and shale dashboard, shale leather upholstery and pleated door panel bolsters, a chrome grille, and a standard 6.0 liter V8 producing . The OnStar system was upgraded for the 2005 model year and had become a digital system instead of the analog system that had been in use.

In 2003, a year after their introduction, the GMT800-based Cadillac Escalade and Escalade EXT received an interior facelift, while the exterior design was left mostly unchanged. The audio system was upgraded to offer two different radio options: an AM/FM radio with cassette and single-disc CD players, or an AM/FM radio with a single-disc CD player and a touchscreen GPS navigation system (Radio Data System (RDS) was also included with both radios). Both radio options included a separate six-disc, in-dash CD changer unit mounted in the lower portion of the instrument panel and controlled via the radio (the CD changer still featured numbered buttons for disc selection, as well as 'Load' and 'Eject' buttons). The Driver Information Center (DIC) was moved from a separate unit in the instrument panel to the odometer display screen in the instrument cluster, where the gauges were also revised with the larger odometer display screen. XM Satellite Radio became available, and the OnStar telematics system controls were relocated from the instrument panel to the electrochromic inside rearview mirror (ISRV). A rear seat DVD entertainment system, which included two pairs of wireless headphones, and was produced by Panasonic, was also a new option for the 2003 model year. The instrument panel and steering wheel both featured updated designs (the steering wheel now also featured remote audio system, OnStar, and speed (cruise control) buttons on the front of the wheel). The electrochromic inside rearview mirror (ISRV) now integrated the OnStar system controls in addition to the exterior (outside) temperature display and integrated directional compass. The front and second and third-row seat designs were updated, and the Zebrano interior trim was replaced with Burlwood. The Escalade ESV (extended-length model) debuted for the 2003 model year. Finally, the warning chimes now played through the front driver's door speaker, as opposed to a separately mounted chime module on 2002 models.

Engines
 2002–2003 5.3L LM7 Vortec V8, 
 2004–2006 5.3L LM7 Vortec V8, 
 2002–2006 6.0L LQ9 (8th Digit = N) HO Vortec V8,

Third generation (2007)

The Escalade moved to the new GMT900 platform for the 2007 model year, as the GMT900 platforms together (Silverado/Sierra/Avalanche/Escalade EXT, Tahoe/Suburban/Yukon/Yukon XL/Yukon Denali/Escalade) were launched together for that year.  The regular Escalade was again joined by a stretched ESV version as well as a new EXT sport utility truck. The 2007 Escalade was the official vehicle of Super Bowl XL, with MVP Hines Ward being awarded one of the first Escalades produced.

Production of the redesigned Escalade began at Arlington Assembly in January 2006. It is priced from US$57,280, though the rear-wheel drive version at this price was not produced until August. The more expensive all-wheel drive version was produced first, followed by the long wheelbase ESV and EXT pickup (the latter sourced from the Silao, Mexico, plant) in June.

The Escalade uses an all-aluminum 6.2 L Vortec V8. This pushrod engine includes variable valve timing, a first in a mass-produced non-overhead cam engine. The system adjusts both intake and exhaust timing between two settings. A new six-speed 6L80 automatic transmission is used. The new body completes a 0.363 drag coefficient. In 2010, the Cadillac Escalade's base price was $62,500 for a RWD model, and $65,200 for an AWD model.

Engines
 2007–2014 — 6.2 L Vortec 6200 V8,

Hybrid

A hybrid version of the luxury vehicle debuted at the 2008 South Florida International Auto Show in Miami, and went on sale in 2008 as a 2009 model at a starting price of $74,085 for a two-wheel drive model. In August, 20% of Cadillac Escalade sales were hybrids.

The Hybrid is powered by a 6.0-liter V8. It is joined by two 60-kilowatt electric motors supplied by a nickel-metal hydride battery pack under the rear seat. The unique transmission houses the electric motors along with three different planetary gear sets and four traditional clutches.

Standard features

Standard features of the Cadillac Escalade include air conditioning with tri-zone climate controls, Nuance leather trimmed seats, wood and leather-wrapped steering wheel with audio controls, cruise control, heated front seats and heated 2nd-row seats, 14-way power front seats, memory system, remote engine start, premium sound system, 6-disc CD changer, rear radio controls, compass, power lift-gate, and outside-temperature indicator. The Platinum adds on a DVD entertainment system, navigation system, heated and cooled cup holders, rearview camera, cooled front seats, upgraded leather (Tehama front and second-row upholstery), and power-retractable running boards.

Safety
According to the Insurance Institute for Highway Safety 2007-08 Escalade models had the highest fatality rate of their class with a driver death rate of 33 compared to the class average of 15.

Updates
2008
 On the automatic trunk button, the "off" signal was changed from the Number "0" (Zero) to the word "off".
 Seating capacity was increased to 8 passengers.
 A newly redesigned remote for keyless entry was introduced to further distinguish it from the Chevrolet Tahoe/GMC Denali siblings.
 Express-Up added for the front windows.

2009
 Bluetooth was made standard.
 A power tilt steering wheel was made standard.
 Driver and passenger headrests were updated and no longer able to be tilted.
 The Satellite Navigation System (optional) now added instant traffic updates and rerouting options.

2010
 Partway through the model year, the GM was removed from the vehicle's front doors.
 AFM was added (Active Fuel Management)
 USB Port was added to the center console
 Revised front airbag and door 
 Shifter interlock and a steering wheel lock was added
 Front window switches changed in shape

2011
 2nd-row headrests made larger and no longer adjustable.

2012
 The Escalade Premium had been refreshed and updated to look more like the Escalade Platinum, but the Escalade Premium did have clear see-through taillights.

2013
 Silver Coast Metallic and Sapphire Blue Metallic were added as new color trims, along with a revised grade braking performance.
 LED Running Lights Were Added To Escalade and Escalade ESV Models

2014
 A new color, Midnight Plum Metallic, was added. This is the first time that the Escalade will only be available in both standard and ESV brands, as the EXT and Hybrid models were discontinued, and last year for this generation Escalades.

Fourth generation (2015)

On October 7, 2013, Cadillac unveiled the fourth generation Escalade and Escalade ESV at a star-studded event in New York City, just nearly a month after GM unveiled their next-generation SUVs from Chevrolet and GMC. Cadillac began its campaign to promote the Escalade on August 14, 2013, and started posting teasers online on September 23, 2013, with help from the photographer Autumn de Wilde, who helped reveal more images ahead of the unveiling. A YouTube page called "Escalade Reveal" was set up to showcase the videos along with the countdown to the unveiling. On November 25, 2013, Cadillac began spreading the word of mouth about the 2015 Escalade by placing a front facsimile cutout of the vehicle on display at Saks Fifth Avenue's New York City flagship store during its annual Christmas promotional campaign, which shows the SUV being frozen in wraps.

Production on the 2015 Escalade began in January 2014 at GM's Arlington, Texas assembly plant and went on sale in April 2014 as a 2015 model (with the MSRP starting at around $71,000 for Full Size, $74,000 for ESV), and available in only three trims: Base, Luxury, and Premium. International sales are scheduled to start in the Summer of 2014. They are assigned to the GMT K2XX platform as K2XL. “The 2015 Escalade exterior light signature draws inspiration from a variety of sources, beginning with Cadillac’s heritage of vertical exterior lamps and extending into architecture,” said Exterior Lighting Design Manager Martin Davis.

The Escalade was planned to switch to the unibody Lambda platform but was quickly nixed due to customer aversion. According to a report on Autoblog.com, GM had reissued a redesign on the GM full-size SUV lineup, including the Escalade, for a 2014 release due to increased SUV sales, and was working on its full-size SUV replacements, which would see a possible change in the Escalade's SUV platform. But in July 2013, a series of spy shots revealed that GM will keep the Escalade a body-on-frame SUV. However, GM is looking at expanding the Escalade brand to the large CUV segment, which would see a vehicle using the Escalade badge sharing the same platform as the Chevrolet Traverse and GMC Acadia, which is in the planning stages. According to VP Bob Ferguson, Cadillac's first 3-row Escalade CUV could be introduced in 2016. There is also a possibility that GM might export the Escalade to Australia as a right-hand drive vehicle as part of Cadillac's global expansion, as GM has begun to import its North American vehicles to its Holden division there after discontinuing the latter's locally produced models in 2017.

GM's 6.2-liter EcoTec3 V8, good for 420 horsepower and 460 pound-feet of torque, mated to a six-speed automatic transmission (2015i models and beyond are 8-Speed Automatics), is the only engine offered, along with a new coil-over front suspension and five-link rear setup, a wider track, variable-assist electric power steering and Cadillac's Magnetic Ride Control system with Tour and Sport modes. The interior now has a hand-crafted design that features cut-and-sewn and wrapped materials, with wood trim options. The dashboard was also updated, and the Cadillac CUE system is added as a standard feature, along with an updated security system.

The 2015 Escalade lineup received an 8-speed transmission, surround view camera, and 4G LTE connectivity as part of a mid-year refresh, which also saw the wreaths on the grille disappear from the Escalade as part of Cadillac's plans to update the logo to emphasize the crest on all of its models.

Updates

2016

For the 2016 model year, Cadillac made upgraded changes to the Escalade and Escalade ESV:
 Four new colors are featured: Gray Silk Metallic, Red Passion Tintcoat, Crystal White Tricoat, Dark Emerald Metallic; both Crystal Red Tintcoat and White Diamond Tricoat were discontinued 
 Advanced Diagnostics added to the Cadillac Cue System, which also receive upgraded improvements; SD card slot was removed
 An upgraded Driver Awareness Package that is available on all trims
 IntelliBeam headlamps (all trims)
 Lane Keep Assist
 Rear seat DVD entertainment system, dual independent, LPO
 Third row comfort guides become a service part
 A 12.3″ reconfigurable cluster change to the Normal Blue display
 Cadillac crest loses the wreath design from the logo mid-year into the 2016 model year. Earlier produced 2016 Escalade vehicles feature the wreath design. 
 Platinum trim level reintroduced which is fully loaded with all the Escalade's optional features standard on this trim level plus DVD headrests as part of the rear seat entertainment system besides the overhead DVD player unlike on other trim levels

2017
For the 2017 model year, minor upgraded changes were made to the Cadillac Escalade and Escalade ESV:
 The PRNDM indicator is modified to PRNDL
 The 4WD control knob is modified with new lighting indicators
 Two new colors, Dark Adriatic Blue Metallic and Bronze Dune Metallic, are added, with two (Dark Emerald, Majestic Plum) others deleted.
 An updated Cadillac Cue system combining both Collection and Teen Driver features
 Addition of the Live-View rear-vision camera to the rear-view-mirror.
 The trims base levels were restructured to Standard, Luxury, Premium Luxury, and Platinum.
 New Radiant Package added
 Rear seat reminder added
 Rear Seat Entertainment switched from RCA to HDMI input.
 Front grille and headlights have been refreshed.

2018
Changes were made to the 2018 Escalade and Escalade ESV:
 Satin Steel Metallic is added as a new color, replacing both Silver Coast Metallic and Amethyst Metallic 
 Shale/Jet Black (all trims) and Maple Sugar/Jet Black (Platinum only) are the new combined interior options, replacing Shale/Cocoa and Tuscan Brown
 The entire console center is modified, along with the cup holders and a new seat memory system.
 A new 10-speed transmission is added, replacing the 8-speed transmission.

2019 
Minor changes that were made for the 2019 Escalade/ESV are:
Manhattan Noir Metallic and Shadow Metallic colors are introduced, replacing the Midnight Sky Metallic and Dark Granite Metallic colors.
Logo Light added to hands free liftgate
New Sport Package added as an available option on Luxury, Premium Luxury, and Platinum trim levels

2020
The 2020 Escalade is the final model year for the fourth-generation version, as it will be sold during its shortened period. The only changes made are the deletion of the Manhattan Noir Metallic and Bronze Dune Metallic color palette and the addition of the Dark Mocha Metallic color. The dealer-ordered Escalade Noir package is also eliminated after being offered for only a year. GM had proposed a facelift for the 2020 model which was going to look like the Cadillac XT6 style grille, but will not happen due to the next generation Escalade that is expected to debut in late 2019 or early 2020 as a 2021 model.

Hennessey HPE550
The upgrades, once they are ordered by customers, have a set price of $15,950.

International version
In July 2015, GM reached a deal with Unison SP ZAO in Minsk, Belarus, to build and assemble the Escalade and Escalade ESV for the Russian and CIS markets. This version will be similar to the Chevrolet Tahoe, featuring the 6.2L V8 EcoTec3 engine and the Tahoe's semi-CKD assembled designs; the ESV also marked the first time an extended-length base model has been offered in this region. It will be available in 4WD models only and carry a MSRP of 4.34 million rubles (US$76,984) for standard-size and 4.59 million rubles (US$81,383) for ESV.

Critical reception
The reviews for the fourth generation Escalade's redesign have been met with positive results from automotive critics. USA Today's James R. Healey and Fred Meier noted that "The once-unthinkable big Cadillac SUV has become indispensable." CNET's Antuan Goodwin notes that "Fans of the Escalade will appreciate the automaker's sticking with the original message and not "ruining" its former flagship, but if you already think the giant luxury SUV is a relic of the past, there's nothing in the 2015 Escalade that will convince you that it's anything but an old dog that's learned a few cool new tricks." Carscoops noted that "It may have impressed us more if a) it had shown the Escalade first instead of last, after the Chevrolet and GMC models or b) if the Chevrolet Tahoe and Suburban and GMC Yukon and Yukon XL simply did not exist…" and added that Cadillac has won their attention with the redesign. Scott Burgess of Motor Trend summed up the redesign in its headline, saying its "It's bigger, it's bolder and it's more beautiful." Bill Visnic of Edmunds concluded in his review that "With subtle, new sheet metal refreshingly free of styling gimmicks, Cadillac's looking to the 2015 Escalade's all-new and upgraded interior to help it retain its role as the benchmark of bling SUVs." The vehicle received a positive review by Autoblog contributor Michael Hartley, who took a road trip with a standard 4WD full-size trim from Los Angeles to Monterey, California. Although Hartley was skeptical at first, he came away impressed: "A 600-mile trip in the Escalade left me convinced that it has the features, build quality and driving dynamics to strike new fear in the segment." Bloomberg News, in its March 27, 2015 review, cited the Escalade as one of the best American-built SUVs ever made, adding that when comparing it to its foreign competitors, "It's the best we make."

GM recently hired Infiniti's Johan de Nysschen to serve as Cadillac president and help revitalize the brand. June 2014 shipments showed Cadillac down a few percent for the year, however the Escalade was among the biggest winners with a 74-percent sales jump and was one of Cadillac's best sellers the following July. As of March 2015, both standard and ESV Escalades have contributed to massive sales with the full-size Escalade seeing a 117% increase and the ESV soaring to 114% overall.

On August 20, 2014, Automotive News and Autoblog began reporting that Cadillac dealers have been waiting three times longer than usual—a month or more—from the time an Escalade leaves the assembly line to when it gets delivered, saying they don't always know where their vehicles are in transit, or when they are set to arrive, upsetting customers who have put down deposits, leading to Cadillac dealerships to reportedly stop taking pre-orders. Even customers who placed orders as far as February 2014 are still waiting for the vehicles according to the dealerships' owners. Cadillac blames the delays on two weeks of "dwell time," citing "a lengthy quality-assurance process on some interior parts" that caused the lag, as well as additional issues with figuring out which vehicles should be delivered first. Despite the setback, Cadillac does plan to correct the issues with adding more employees and speed up production at the Arlington plant.

On March 16, 2016, Consumer Reports named the 2016 Escalade the worst large sized luxury SUV in its annual rankings, with an overall score of 44. Most of the criticism came from its room space, second-row seating, the CUE media system, stopping, stiff road handling, and its redesign, calling it the worst in class.

Recalls
In May 2014, GM recalled 1,402 units of the 2015 Escalade and Escalade ESV that were built between January 2014 to May 2014 due to "an insufficiently heated plastic weld that attaches the (front) passenger side air bag to the instrument panel assembly could result in a partial deployment of the air bag in the event of a crash." GM also placed a temporary halt on further sales and informed owners of the affected vehicles to not let passengers sit in the front passenger seat until they are replaced.

Fifth generation (2021) 

The fifth generation Escalade debuted on February 4, 2020, in Beverly Hills, California, for the 2021 model year, with sales commencing in the fall of 2020. Although production of the 2021 Escalade was pushed back due to the growing pandemic, GM had the vehicle scheduled to hit dealerships as planned. Dealers started taking pre-orders on April 23, 2020. To hype up the Escalade, Cadillac launched a 3D visualizer showcasing the vehicle. This visualizer lets the user interact with the Escalade and Escalade ESV by turning on the lights, changing the color, changing the rims, and looking at the interior.

The fifth generation Escalade is built on the GMT1XX platform, sharing it with the Chevrolet Tahoe/GMC Yukon and Chevrolet Suburban/GMC Yukon XL, and have a front grille design similar to the one used on Cadillac's XT crossovers.

In December 2019, Cadillac unveiled a teaser video that featured a 38-inch curved OLED screen dashboard that displayed the Cadillac crest (on the driver's side) and “Escalade” name (across the passenger side), making this version the most unique in the Cadillac roster. On January 28, 2020, Cadillac introduced the "Super Cruise" feature, allowing for hands-free self-driving. This was followed by on January 31, 2020, of the addition of the turbodiesel 3.0L LM2 inline six-cylinder Duramax engine as a no-charge option, badged as “600D” in line with the automaker's new naming convention. The Escalade is the first diesel-powered Cadillac offered in North America since the 1985 DeVille and Fleetwood, which were available with an Oldsmobile-developed 4.3L V6. On the outside, it is longer than the previous Escalade and has more passenger room (particularly for the second- and third-row occupants) and cargo space.

There are five-level trims available on the fifth generation Escalade: Luxury, Premium Luxury, Sport, Premium Luxury Platinum, and Sport Platinum. The interior choices consist of eight trim options and four seating designs. The AKG audio technology system is new, featuring 36 speakers throughout the cabin.

In November 2020, General Motors announced that the 5th gen Cadillac Escalade will be offered in Japan from 2021. It is available in standard length, two trim levels (Sport Platinum and Premium Luxury Platinum).

Critical reception

Andrew J. Hawkins, writing for The Verge, described driving the Escalade as "one of the most stressful driving experiences I’ve ever had", criticizing its excessive size and the hazard it poses to pedestrians and other road users.

Escalade ESV 
The 2021 Escalade ESV debuted online in April 2020, but its physical unveiling, including one scheduled for the New York International Auto Show was cancelled due to the coronavirus pandemic. It will feature a unique fascia along with the passenger doors and wider exhaust pipes. In November 2020, GM announced that their large SUV lineup would be imported to China. The Escalade ESV was to mark its maiden entry into the country, starting with the fifth-generation models, but GM canceled those plans in February 2021, citing the difficulty of having an import sold alongside its Chinese-built offerings, the makeup of the facilities that would be required to assemble the full-size SUVs, and concerns that the full-size SUVs won't be able to comply with the stringent emission standards imposed by the Government of China.

Escalade-V
Cadillac launched the performance version of the Escalade in 2022, called the Escalade-V. The Escalade-V is the largest performance SUV in the American market. It uses a 6.2-liter V8 supercharged engine. The suggested price starts at $149,990. The V will also be offered in the longer wheelbase ESV model.

Cadillac Escalade EXT

2002–2006

The Escalade EXT sport utility truck (released alongside its twin, the Chevrolet Avalanche) was introduced in 2001 (as a 2002 model) from the Cadillac division of General Motors. It features a "Convert-a-Cab" composite pickup bed that can be expanded into the truck's cab through a bottom-hinged door. Like the Avalanche, the EXT has four full-size doors and seating for five. High-intensity discharge headlights were offered for 2003. The Escalade EXT also appears in the movie, The Matrix Reloaded along with the CTS in product placement ads. All Escalade EXTs were built in Mexico. The Escalade EXT (based on the Cadillac Escalade) was created as a direct competitor to the failed Lincoln Blackwood, a pickup truck based on the Ford F-150. It had competed with the Lincoln Mark LT (now discontinued in the United States and Canada), another F-150-based pickup truck that made its debut in 2005.

2007–2013 

The EXT models were discontinued after the 2013 model year along with the Avalanche. According to Autoblog.com, The EXT was ranked tenth among the worst selling vehicles in the United States for 2013, with only 1,972 units sold. The Escalade EXT was available in the United States, Canada, Mexico, and the Middle East (except Israel).

Platinum
MY04: Cadillac released its first version of the Platinum Escalade. It was only available in the ESV model. It had such features as heated and ventilated Seats (front and back), heated and ventilated cup holders, special 20" wheels, special leathers and interior design, extra labeling and HID headlamps.

MY08: Cadillac offered the Platinum Edition on its redesigned Escalade and Escalade ESV models. It includes such features as a unique front fascia and grille, heated and cooled cup holders, limited edition 22" wheels, additional chrome pieces and accents, 2 additional DVD monitors- located in the headrests of each front seat, special hand stitched leathers, real aluminum interior accents, Advanced Magnetic Ride Control system, genuine olive ash and burled walnut wood interior trim, and LED headlamps.

MY09: An Escalade hybrid model was new for 2009.

MY12: The Escalade had a mid-cycle refresh on Platinum trim with dual exhaust and more color options including White diamond, which was an optional feature on Base, Luxury and Premium, but the color was standard free of charge on Platinum edition Escalades.

MY15: The Platinum Escalade went on sale in fall of 2014 with a base MSRP at $90k, a price jump to $9k more than the 2014 Escalade Platinum price. The all-new 2015 Platinum Escalade features Cadillac's all-new emblem, more innovations with Nappa, semi-aniline massaging front seats, and either a choice of Tuscan (beige) or Black leather seating surfaces, and the Platinum Escalade comes with every available feature that the Premium trim has, plus: a suede microfiber headliner, its own unique grille and 22" wheels, 7-inch LCD screens in the headrests and a 9-inch screen in the center and an icebox in the center console.

U.S. sales
Cadillac discontinued tracking the sales of the Escalade ESV in the United States in 2018, as GM combines the sales of both full size and ESV versions from the 2018 model year onward.

References

External links

 Official Cadillac America Forum
 Cadillac Escalade website
 Cadillac Escalade ESV website
 Cadillac Escalade EXT website
 Official UK website

Escalade
Expanded length sport utility vehicles
Full-size sport utility vehicles
Hybrid sport utility vehicles
Luxury sport utility vehicles
Pickup trucks
All-wheel-drive vehicles
Rear-wheel-drive vehicles
2000s cars
2010s cars
2020s cars
Cars introduced in 1998
Motor vehicles manufactured in the United States
Sport utility trucks
Flagship vehicles